Lorance George Rymer (5 July 1934 – 5 December 2017) was an Australian rules footballer who played for the Collingwood Football Club in the Victorian Football League, (VFL).

Laurie Rymer was a ruck rover for Collingwood in the losing 1956 Grand Final against Melbourne.

See also
 1956 VFL season

References

External links

Laurie Rymer's playing statistics from The VFA Project

1934 births
2017 deaths
Australian rules footballers from Victoria (Australia)
Collingwood Football Club players
Preston Football Club (VFA) players